Out of Mind, Out of Sight is a 2014 Canadian documentary film by John Kastner at the Brockville Mental Health Centre. The film concentrates on two floors of the Brockville facility devoted to forensic psychiatry.

Over 18 months, Kastner filmed 46 of the 59 patients on the floors, as well as 75 staff members. The film was shot at the Centre at the same time as Kastner was shooting his 2013 film, NCR: Not Criminally Responsible, exploring the personal impact of the mental disorder defence in Canada.

Out of Mind, Out of Sight was co-produced by J.S. Kastner Prods. and the National Film Board of Canada in association with TVOntario, and had its world broadcast premiere on TVO on May 7, 2014.

Synopsis

The documentary analyzes four residents of the Brockville Mental Health Centre, an institution specializing in forensic psychiatrics associated with patients involved in violent crimes. The two men and two women of the film fight stigma surrounding mental illness to regain control of their lives. Patients attending these institutions often disappear from public eye, and their stories go untold.

Critical reception

The film was named Best Canadian Feature Documentary at the Hot Docs Canadian International Documentary Festival.

Writer Michael Thomas from Digital Journal said "Out of Mind, Out of Sight covers nearly every topic one could think of about mental hospitals — what kind of medication do they have, and how often? Do romantic relationships happen on the premises? How are these people treated? Do they have the potential to become violent? All of these questions are answered" and "Despite the grim subject matter, there is some warmth and humour to be found."

References

External links

Out of Mind, Out of Sight at TVO
Out of Mind, Out of Sight at Hot Docs

2014 documentary films
2014 films
Films directed by John Kastner
Films set in psychiatric hospitals
Films shot in Ontario
National Film Board of Canada documentaries
TVO original programming
Documentary films about forensic psychiatry
2010s Canadian films
2010s English-language films
English-language documentary films